Rademann is a German surname. Notable people with the surname include:

 Hans-Christoph Rademann (born 1965), German conductor
 Wolfgang Rademann (1934–2016), German television producer and journalist

See also
 Rademan

German-language surnames